is a Japanese copywriter and former idol. She is a former member of the Japanese idol girl group AKB48, where she was part of Team B.

Biography 
Uchiyama passed AKB48's 14th generation auditions on 13 May 2012. She debuted on 9 July 2012. In August 2013, she was promoted to the newly formed Team 4. In February 2014, during the AKB48 Group Shuffle, it was announced that Uchiyama would be transferred to Team B. In April 2014, Uchiyama enrolled in Keio University.

In the 2014 AKB48 Group general election, Uchiyama ranked for the first time at 63rd place.

Uchiyama's special skill as an idol was to recite articles of the Japanese Constitution. They co-wrote the book with the hope that Japanese teenagers would get a basic grounding and become interested in constitutional discourse, since although the voting age in Japan has been lowered to 18 years old, education on the matter was considered lacking.

On November 1, 2015, she announced her graduation from AKB48, and she completed her final activity as a member on February 21, 2016.

In March 2018, she graduated from the Faculty of Economics of Keio University and left Horipro. She joined the Hakuhodo advertising agency the same year. In 2020, her team won the Grand Prix in the Brain Online Video Award competition.

Discography

AKB48 singles

Appearances

Stage units
AKB48 Kenkyuusei Stage 
 
Team 4 2nd Stage 
 
AKB48 Team B 3rd Stage  (Revival)

TV variety
 AKBingo!

TV dramas
  (2015), Kenpou (Team Hinabe)
  (2015), Kenpou (Team Hinabe)

Bibliography 
  (2014), co-authored with Shigeru Minamino

References

External links
 
 Natsuki Uchiyama on Google+ (last act on AKB48)
 

1995 births
Living people
Japanese idols
Japanese women pop singers
Musicians from Kanagawa Prefecture
AKB48 members
Keio University alumni